The Port Huron Beacons were a minor league professional ice hockey team in the United Hockey League (UHL) that played from 2002 to 2005. The team was based in Port Huron, Michigan, and played at the McMorran Arena.

The team's first head coach was Brad Jones, a former National Hockey League player and head coach of the UHL's B.C. Icemen. The team's first general manager was Kevin J. Carr from 2001 to 2004. Jones resigned in February 2003 with a 24–24–5 record and was replaced by Bruce Ramsey for the remainder of the season.

Ramsey returned as head coach for the 2003–04 season and led the team to the semifinals in the playoffs, but was fired in the following offseason. The Beacons then hired former NHL player Mark Kumpel, but he resigned without coaching a game and was replaced by Rick Adduono, the former head coach of the Greensboro Generals, for the 2004–05 season. Gino Giacumbo served as vice president in 2003–04 and as general manager in 2004–05.

The Beacons departed in 2005 to become the Roanoke Valley Vipers.

Season-by-season results

References

External links
Port Huron Beacons at HockeyDB

Defunct United Hockey League teams
Defunct ice hockey teams in the United States
Professional ice hockey teams in Michigan
Port Huron, Michigan
Ice hockey clubs established in 2002
Ice hockey clubs disestablished in 2005
2002 establishments in Michigan
2005 disestablishments in Michigan